The term  refrigerate after opening is an instruction on commercial preserved food products to cool the container after it has been opened and the contents exposed to open air.

Moist foods are commonly preserved using canning and vacuum sealing to kill off any bacteria and molds, and to prevent further growth by removing oxygen. Dry-product containers are often preserved with heat and filling the empty container spaces with an  inert non-reactive gas such as nitrogen. 

Once opened for consumption, the product is immediately exposed to atmospheric oxygen and floating dust particles containing bacteria and mold spores, and all protections from the preservation process are immediately lost. At room temperature, mold and bacteria growth resumes almost immediately, and warmer temperatures can lead to an explosion of growth that rapidly degrades the food product. This organic growth can result in the accumulation of poisonous bacterial substances in the food product such as botulin, that lead to food poisoning, sickness, or death.

Cooling the food product to a temperature just above freezing in a refrigerator is generally required to slow the growth of these organisms. This cooling can permit foods to remain safely edible for up to two weeks after opening.

Simply loosening the lid of a vacuum-packed food product to break the seal is enough to permit the bacteria and mold growth to resume. The amount of air inhaled into the container when the seal is broken is small but sufficient to permit the slow growth of contaminating and decomposing organisms.

This seal is extremely important to the safe preservation of the food product. That is why most preserved screw-top food products use a domed metal cover that emits an audible popping sound as the container is opened. The dome is held down by the vacuum seal and will not make a popping sound when the cover is pressed on a properly sealed container.

See also 

 Refrigeration
 Food preservation
 Food poisoning

References

External links 
 How long does the food keep in the pantry? http://www.demesne.info/Home-Maintenance/Pantry.htm
 Do jars always have to pop? http://en.allexperts.com/q/Food-Safety-Issues-767/2008/4/jars-pop.htm

Food preservation